Cerro de los Siete Colores (The Hill of Seven Colors) is one of the hills bordering the Quebrada de Purmamarca which is in turn is a western branch of the Quebrada de Humahuaca up to Cuesta del Lipán, in Jujuy Province, Argentina.
Its unique color range is the product of a complex geological history including marine sediments, lake and river movements elevated with the movement of the tectonic plates.

Aside from the commonly known name this colorful hill carries, the locals of the town of Purmamarca also refer to it as the Hill of the Seven Skirts. This is an unofficial name, and not many people other than those who live here refer to it this way. The reasoning behind this second name is because of the resemblance between the colors on the hill and that of the traditional, long skirts worn by Andean women.

This breathtaking sight is composed of seven different colors, all of which derive from different types of rocks; leading to its diverse range of colours. Each color/rock is also said to have formed during different time periods. Firstly, pink is believed to be composed of red clay, mudstone (mud) and arilitas (sand). Its estimated age goes back about 3 to 4 million years. The shade of white surrounding the pink is mostly made up of limestone and is aged about 400 million years. Continuing onto the mix of brown and purples, which are composed of lead, and rich in calcium carbonate, and is 80 to 90 million years of age. On top of the purple-brown color, there is an earthy brown colour that has been detected in the rock. The rocks making up this color are the most recent colors appearing on the rocks, aging at 1 to 2 million years old, and is described as ‘fanglomerate composed of rock with manganese belonging to Quaternary.’ As for the red, which is composed of claystones (iron) and other clays belonging to the upper Tertiary, its said to also be aged around 3 to 4 million years. The shades of green, aging at about 600 million years, are made up of phyllites, and slates of copper oxide. Finally, the yellow mustard color is made of sandstones with sulfur, and is estimated at 80 to 90 million years.

Legend has it:

It is said that when the small town of Purmamarca, situated at the bottom of the hills, was formed, they had no color to them, making them as dull as any other mountain, or hill. To the imaginative minds of the young children of Purmamarca, this was unacceptable. Whilst the adults of the town deemed it as normal, and something to be ignored, or ‘gotten used to’, the children refused to conform to this belief, and decided to do something unbelievable. Despite their warnings to the adults, none of them seemed to take the children seriously. This did not make a difference though, and they moved forward with their plan, regardless. 
For seven nights following their decision to decorate the hillside, the children disappeared from their beds, and every morning the adults would wake with a surprise; a new color was added to the hill. On the seventh night, all of the adults in the town woke early and found that all the children were missing from their beds. Panicked, the adults began to search the town for their children. After having searched the entire town with nothing to show for it, all of the children began skipping down the hillside, laughing and playing. Since these seven nights, the hill has been completely covered in the seven colors that the children painted onto it. 
Every year on this day since, the town of Purmamarca has a celebration in honour of the painting of the colourful hillside.

Tourism/Access to the hill:

The hill is said to be the most beautiful during the first 45 minutes after dawn, and is no stranger to tourists who choose to take advantage of the breathtaking sight. Tours are also offered of the town of Purmamarca, situated at the base of the colorful hills, which include them as one of the biggest attractions. There are also specific tours of the hills themselves via horseback rides, hikes/walks, bike tours and photographic safaris. 
If you are looking to hike to the mountain, there are two trails that lead to promising lookout points, one that is a ten-minute walk, and the other being an hour walk. Information on how to get to these locations, etc., is not difficult to find within the town through the tourism office.

The town of Purmamarca:

Purmamarca is considered one of the most ‘picturesque villages in the Humahuaca Ravine.’ This town is a quaint little town nudged at the bottom of the famous hills. Largely focused on the tourists that come to see the mountain; the town has a lot of artisan stands selling all kinds of tapestries, hand-knitted clothing, artwork, sculptures, pottery, etc. 
There are many celebrations honored through the town, proving the thick culture within its people. Some of which include the "‘misa-chico’, the dead worship, the Pachamama worship or the autochthonous music played with quenas (Indian flute), cajas, erques and sikus."

See also 
 Purmamarca
 Quebrada de Humahuaca
 Pucará de Tilcara

References

External links
Article on the hill in the newspaper Sin Mordaza. (In spanish)

Tourist attractions in Jujuy Province